Papegem is a village in the municipality of Lede located in the Belgian province of East Flanders in the Denderstreek. It has an area of 0.58 km². The Wellebeek (a brook) which flows there belongs to the basin of the Molenbeek which originates from the Upper Scheldt, and flows through Erpe-Mere. In the past the Wellebeek was called the Papegemsche beek. It is bordered by the sub-municipalities of Oordegem, Smetlede and Impe, as well as the municipalities of Sint-Lievens-Houtem (sub-municipality Vlierzele) and Erpe-Mere (sub-municipality Erondegem, despite the small size of Papegem. In Papegem the Sint-Macharius Chapel can be found. Papegem belongs to the deanery of Herzele-Houtem.

History 
The Sint-Macharius Chapel was founded in 1890 on account of a typhus epidemic. It was inaugurated on 10 May 1891. In 1958/1959 there was a temporary church built which was received by the inauguration of Macharius as a patron saint. Before the merger of the municipalities in 1977, Papegem was a residential area of Vlierzele and had no street names. However, Papegem is now a village with about 400 inhabitants. Every year on the first weekend after the 8 May, there is a 9 day procession in honor of the Holy Macharius with a fair.

Landmarks 
 Sint-Machariuschurch
 Sint-Machariuschappel at Papegemstraat
 Onze Lieve Vrouwchappel at Putbosstraat
 Hof te Papegem, abbeyfarm, Papegemstraat 95
 View on Papegem at Papegemstraat, which has border signs of a sub-municipality

Gallery

References 

Lede, Belgium
Populated places in East Flanders